Leo Fiederer (4 April 1897 – October 1946) was a German international footballer.

References

1897 births
1946 deaths
Association football defenders
Association football midfielders
Association football forwards
German footballers
Germany international footballers